Karlowa is a surname. Notable people with this surname include:

 Elma Karlowa (1932–1994), Yugoslav film and television actress
 Otto Karlowa (1883–1940), German Naval Officer and diplomat